The 1996 Australian Touring Car Championship was a CAMS sanctioned motor racing title for drivers of 5.0 Litre Touring Cars complying with Australian Group 3A regulations. The championship, which was the 37th Australian Touring Car Championship, was promoted as the Shell Australian Touring Car Championship. It was contested over ten rounds between January 1996 and June 1996. The championship was contested earlier in the year than usual as much of telecaster Channel 7's broadcast equipment was required for its 1996 Summer Olympics coverage. 1996 was the last year in which Channel 7 would broadcast the championship until 2007, with Network Ten taking over the broadcast rights from the 1997 season onwards.

The championship was won by Craig Lowndes driving a Holden VR Commodore entered by the Holden Racing Team.

Television Coverage

Channel 7's coverage was again a same day delayed broadcast which saw Garry Wilkinson return to the coverage as host and eventually as a commentator alongside Mark Oastler after Andy Raymond was moved from the broadcast booth (where he started the season) to the pits and Brad Jones joined the team as their full-time expert.

Mike Raymond retired from broadcasting full-time after the 1995 Bathurst 1000.

Pre season
At the end of 1995, tobacco sponsorship was prohibited by the Federal Government. A tight sponsorship market resulted in both Gibson Motorsport and Glenn Seton Racing scaling back to one car. Philip Morris sought to circumnavigate this by sponsoring Alan Jones Racing under a generic name.

Teams and drivers
Movements
Alan Jones moved from Glenn Seton Racing, forming Alan Jones Racing in partnership with Jim and Ross Stone
Paul Romano joined Alan Jones Racing from Romano Racing
Greg Crick replaced David Attard at Alcair Racing

Arrivals / returnees
Garry Rogers Motorsport joined the series with Steven Richards driving an ex Gibson Motorsport VR Commodore
John Faulkner Racing joined the series with John Faulkner driving an ex Holden Racing Team VR Commodore
John Sidney Racing joined the series with Max Dumsney driving an ex Glenn Seton Racing EF Falcon
Longhurst Racing expanded to two cars with a customer EF Falcon for Steve Ellery
Craig Lowndes replaced Tomas Mezera at the Holden Racing Team
M3 Motorsport returned to the series for the first time since 1993 with John Cotter and Peter Doulman sharing the driving of an ex Perkins Engineering VP Commodore
Perkins Engineering expanded to two cars with Russell Ingall joining the series

Departures
With Gibson Motorsport scaling back to one car, Jim Richards left the series
1995 Privateer's Champion David Attard did not defend his crown

The following teams and drivers competed in the 1996 Australian Touring Car Championship:

Race calendar
The championship was contested over a ten-round series with three races per round.

Points system
Championship points were awarded on a 20-16-14-12-10-8-6-4-2-1 basis to the top ten finishers in each race.

Results

See also
 1996 Australian Touring Car season
 1996 Tickford 500
 1996 AMP Bathurst 1000

References

External links
1996 Australian Touring Car racing images at www.autopics.com.au

Australian Touring Car Championship seasons
Touring Car Championship
1996 in V8 Supercars